George Welch may refer to:
George Welch (pilot) (1918–1954), flying ace and test pilot
George Welch, head of the Pittsburgh Academy in 1789
George Patrick Welch (1900–1973), historian and author
George W. Welch (architect) (1886–?), American architect
George W. Welch (Medal of Honor), American soldier and Medal of Honor recipient

See also
George Welsh (disambiguation)